The 1945 Saint Mary's Gaels football team was an American football team that represented Saint Mary's College of California during the 1945 college football season.  In their fourth season under head coach and College Football Hall of Fame inductee James Phelan, the Gaels compiled a 7–2 record, outscored their opponents by a combined total of 282 to 65, and were ranked No. 7 in the final AP Poll.  The Gaels' victories included a 20–13 besting of California and a 26–0 victory over USC. Their only loss during the regular season was to UCLA by a 13–7 score. The Gaels were invited to play in the 1946 Sugar Bowl where they lost to an undefeated No. 5-ranked Oklahoma A&M by a 33–13 score.

The team led the nation in passing offense with an average of 161.3 passing yards per game. College Football Hall of Fame inductee Herman Wedemeyer ranked second nationally with 1,040 passing yards.

Three Gaels received honors on the 1945 All-Pacific Coast football team: Wedemeyer at halfback (AP-1, UP-1); Charles Albert (Spike) Cordeiro, Jr. at halfback (UP-1); and Ed Ryan at end (AP-1, UP-1).

Schedule

References

Saint Mary's
Saint Mary's Gaels football seasons
Saint Mary's Gaels football